New Zealand competed at the 1998 Winter Olympics in Nagano, Japan.

Alpine skiing

Women

Bobsleigh

Freestyle skiing

Men

Women

Luge

Women

Snowboarding

Women's giant slalom

Speed skating

Men

References
Official Olympic Reports
 Olympic Winter Games 1998, full results by sports-reference.com

Nations at the 1998 Winter Olympics
1998
Winter Olympics